Wiesław Romanowski (born August 18, 1952) is a Polish journalist and publicist, opposition activist in Communist Poland, and diplomat.

During the  Martial law in Poland he was interned (1981-1982) for his oppositional activities.

1998-2005, reporter of Polish TV in Ukraine.

Filmography
Romanowski is a screenwriter, director, and producer of over 10 documentary films.
 1995 – Moskwa jak las (together with Andrzej Drawicz)
 1995 – Sprawa polityczna
 1996 – Dwie historie 
 1997 – Pudełka Stalina (Stalin's Boxes; a documentary about the visit to the archives of the FSB, where he was allowed to see the boxes with the cases of Poles repressed in the Soviet Union during Stalin's times 
 1998 – Znak pokoju
 2002 – Nie chcę tego oglądać
 2005 – Dom na wzgórzu
 2005 – Przystanek wolność ("Station Liberty"), about the Orange Revolution
 2008 – Feliks znaczy szczęśliwy ("Felix Means Happy"), about Felix Dzerzhinski

Books
 Ukraina. Przystanek Wolność ("Ukraine. Station Liberty"), Wydawnictwo Literackie 2006, 
 Bandera. Terorysta Z Galicji ("Bandera. A Terrorist from Galicia"), Wydawnictwo Demart 2012,

References

1952 births
Living people
20th-century Polish journalists
21st-century Polish journalists
Polish male writers
Polish screenwriters